Durchhausen is a town in the district of Tuttlingen in Baden-Württemberg in Germany. The design and development center of Allegion Security Technologies with its brand Interflex is in Durchhausen.

References

Tuttlingen (district)
Württemberg